Parquet is a type of wooden flooring.

Parquet may also refer to:

People
 Jeremy Parquet (born 1982), gridiron football player
 Paul Parquet (1856–1916), French perfumer

Other uses
 Parquet (legal), the office for legal prosecution in some countries
 Apache Parquet, a columnar data file format

See also
 Parquet Courts, an American rock band